The circled dot, circumpunct, or circle with a point at its centre may refer to one or more of these glyphs or articles

Solar system
One of many solar symbols used to represent the Sun
  (Planet symbol in astronomy) 
Gold (Alchemical symbols: planetary metals)
 Gardiner N5: The sun, part of the representation of the name of Ra in Egyptian hieroglyphs. (This hieroglyph is shown conventionally with a small circle (rather than a dot) with the larger circle.
 The sun / a day (Chinese oracle script, the modern character being 日)

Philosophy and psychology
 Self in Jungian psychology: "The central dot represents the Ego whereas the Self can be said to consist of the whole with the centred dot."
 Monism: "The circled dot was used by the Pythagoreans and later Greeks to represent the first metaphysical being, the Monad or The Absolute"

Language and linguistics
 Bilabial clicks, a symbol in the International Phonetic Alphabet.
 Hwair, a letter in the Gothic alphabet
 Yas, a letter in the Tifinagh Alphabet (Berber languages) 
 Brāhmī letter th
 Eye (Blissymbols)

 A brief contact (brush) of the signing hand in SignWriting

Mathematics
 The mathematical operator  represents 
the XNOR gate or 
the Hadamard product, the element wise multiplication of matrices of same size denoted by 
 The mathematical operator  (see Unicode Supplemental Mathematical Operators)
 In geometry, it is often the symbol for a circle

Computing
  (Unicode Geometric Shapes) 
 An indication of selected choice of radio button
 the application launcher key on Chromebooks (also known as the "everything key")

Other uses
 A nazar is a circled-dot-shaped amulet
 Center of pressure
 Used, or cancelled, stamp (philately)
 The trademark of the Target Corporation
 As a symbol of the phallus or nature's generative principle and of an Entered Apprentice Freemason
 City centre (European road-signs)
 End of trail / End of the game. Gone home. (scouting)
 The Symbol of "Waterhole" (or a related concept) in Australian Aborigine Art
 In Germany it is symbol for a "Gestempelte Briefmarke" (canceled stamp), while a star means "postfrisch" (mint Stamp)
 In physics, it can be used to denote a vector facing out of the page
 Zugzwang in chess notation

See also
 The Lost Symbol - a novel by Dan Brown that uses this symbol.

References